The disarmament of the German Jews started in 1933, initially limited to local areas. A major target was Berlin, where large-scale raids in search for weaponry took place. Starting in 1936, the Gestapo prohibited German police officers from giving firearms licenses to Jews. In November 1938, the Verordnung gegen den Waffenbesitz der Juden prohibited the possession of firearms and bladed weapons by Jews.

Weimar Republic 
The legal foundations that the Nazi Party later used for the purpose of disarming the Jews were already laid during the Weimar Republic. Starting with the Reichsgesetz über Schusswaffen und Munition (Reich law on firearms and ammunition), enacted on 12 April 1928, weapon purchase permits were introduced, which only allowed "authorized persons" the purchase and possession of firearms. Mandatory registration of weapons was introduced, which gave the government the opportunity of accessing weapon owner and their weapons at any given time. Manufacture and sale of weapons was only permitted if authorized so. The purpose was to ensure that firearms were only issued to "reliable individuals". Starting in 1930, bladed weapons were also regulated. The carrying of weapons in public now required a weapons permit.

Takeover by the Nazi Party 

Immediately following the "Machtergreifung" in 1933, the weapon laws of the Weimar Republic were used to disarm Jews, or to use the excuse of "searching for weapons" as a justification for raids and searches of homes. Because the weapons law of 1928 gave the police the authority to issue or withdraw weapon permits, Jewish weapon owners were disarmed through warrants issued by the police. For instance, the president of the police of Breslau enacted an order on 21 April 1933 which stated that Jews had to give their weapons and shooting permits to the police immediately. After the Jewish population was judged as not to be trusted, no weapon permits were issued to them.

The weapons law was also used for searches of homes and raids. The preface for that was the allegation that the victims of these searches stored large amounts of weapons and ammunition. A prominent example is Albert Einstein, whose summer residence in Caputh, near the Schwielowsee was searched in spring 1933. The only item found there was a bread knife. Raids, for instance on 4 April 1933 at the Scheunenviertel in Berlin, also took place. Not only many weapons were found, but also a lot of publications that included criticism of Nazi Germany. Sometimes, Jews without residence permits were also found and arrested.

Starting in 1935, the Gestapo prevented the issue of weapon permits and weapon purchase permits to Jews. The police authorities were the executing authorities, and had to comply with the orders issued by the Gestapo. The self-defense of Jews was abolished and they were subjected to the arbitrariness and terror of the police authorities, without the need to introduce a new law for this.

Weapons law and act of 1938 
In 1938, the Nazi Party reformed weapons law thoroughly. Today, the Waffengesetz of 18 March 1938 (RGBl I, 265) is sometimes seen as a relaxation of existing regulations, even though it solely benefited privileged members of the NSDAP and its associated organizations. The law stated that certain groups of NSDAP officials did not need any permit anymore for weapons possession. Amongst them were Unterführer of the NSDAP, starting from Ortsgruppenleiter, the Sturmabteilung, the Schutzstaffel, the National Socialist Motor Corps and also the Hitler youth, starting at Bannführer. The new weapons law also prohibited the possession of any weapons to certain groups of people, namely Gypsies and all individuals who lost their "Civil Honors" or who were under supervision of the police. The latter also included people convicted due to homosexuality.

Directly after the Kristallnacht, the possession of any weapons by Jews was prohibited through the Verordnung gegen den Waffenbesitz der Juden, enacted on 11 November 1938 (RGBl. I, 1573).

A contemporary report of the apostolic nuntius of Berlin to Eugenio Pacelli about the Kristallnacht stated: „Also, all weapons were taken from the Jews; and even though the purpose of that was altogether different, it was good, because the ideation of suicide must have been enormous in some.“

Contemporary US discourse on gun control

Gun laws in Nazi Germany have been the subject of debate in the United States over gun regulations, with various opponents of gun regulation arguing that Nazi Germany's restrictions on gun ownership allowed them to cement power or to implement the Holocaust. Fact-checkers have described these claims or theories as "false" or "debunked". On the whole, gun laws were actually made less stringent for most non-Jewish German citizens during Nazi rule. While Jews were subject to having their guns seized, the gun registry was so incomplete that many Jews retained their guns. In October of 2015, responding to statements made by Ben Carson, history professor Alan E. Steinweis wrote in a New York Times piece:The Jews of Germany constituted less than 1 percent of the country's population. It is preposterous to argue that the possession of firearms would have enabled them to mount resistance against a systematic program of persecution implemented by a modern bureaucracy, enforced by a well-armed police state, and either supported or tolerated by the majority of the German population. Mr. Carson's suggestion that ordinary Germans, had they had guns, would have risked their lives in armed resistance against the regime simply does not comport with the regrettable historical reality of a regime that was quite popular at home. Inside Germany, only the army possessed the physical force necessary for defying or overthrowing the Nazis, but the generals had thrown in their lot with Hitler early on.

References

Further reading 
 Stephen P. Halbrook: Nazi Firearms Law and the Disarming of the German Jews, in: Arizona Journal of International and Comparative Law, No. 3, 2000, pp. 483–535 (PDF, 153 kB, English)

External links 
 Waffengesetz vom 18. März 1938 (RGBl I, 265)
 Verordnung gegen den Waffenbesitz der Juden vom 11. November 1938 (RGBl I, 1573)

The Holocaust in Germany
Law in Nazi Germany
Antisemitism in Germany
Firearm laws
Jewish military history
Holocaust racial laws